The 1938–39 Allsvenskan was the fifth season of the top division of Swedish handball. Eight teams competed in the league. Redbergslids IK won the league, but the title of Swedish Champions was awarded to the winner of Svenska mästerskapet. SoIK Hellas and GF Frithiof were relegated.

League table

Attendance

References 

Swedish handball competitions